Transcendental perspectivism (also transcendental perspectivalism) is a hybrid philosophy developed by German-born philosopher, Werner Krieglstein.  A blending of Friedrich Nietzsche's perspectivism and the utopian ideals of the transcendentalism movement, transcendental perspectivism challenges Nietzsche's claim that there are no absolute truths while fully accepting his observation that all truth can only be known in the context of one's own perception.  This is accomplished through an appreciation of the emotional relationship between two perceptions (the "perceiver" and the "other").

Background 
Friedrich Nietzsche argued that no purely objective science can exist because no ideation or thought can exist outside the influences of an individual perception.  The ideation of any single perception is limited not only by the physics of its existence, but also by its own assumptions and beliefs which are formed by the perceiver's unique culture and history.  A conclusion of this philosophy is that no absolute (or transcendental) truth can exist because in order to be a transcendental truth it would need to transcend the limits of perception.

Relationship to the Other 
For any given truth, a perceiver must realize it.  In any given relationship, that truth can be shared with another perceiver (the other). In the traditional sense of objective reality, a transcendental truth known by one perceiver would be equally valid for the other, because it transcends each of their unique perceptions.  This relationship is unequal in that the transcendental truth is right and the other is wrong.  Knowers of a transcendental truth are then provided with unique authority over the other which does not know the same truth.

In Perspectivism, the absence of any transcendental truth leaves the perceiver with truth that is only valid from the perceiver's own perspective.  Truth becomes arbitrary and the other becomes a pawn in the formulations of the perceiver's self-perceived truths.  This led Nietzsche to ponder the justification of things like authoritarianism that conflict with the moral positions of many philosophers.

Transcendental perspectivism argues that each truth is the product of the perceiver; however, if two perceivers share a truth, then that truth transcends each individual perceiver.  This is achieved not by one perceiver convincing the other about the validity of a held truth, but rather by the union of two truths held by each perceiver.  The other's perception plays an equal role in the development of a transcendental truth. A key artifact of transcendental perspectivism is that the transcendence of a truth can not be achieved through force.  That is, if a truth held by a perceiver is forced on the other, then that truth has not transcended both perceptions.  Domination of the other has only produced subjugation, and can not produce acceptance of a shared truth because the perspective of the other was not involved in the development of the truth and thus the truth is not true for the other. In order to avoid domination and to truly develop a transcendental truth, the perceiver must experience empathy and compassion for the perception of the other.

A logic formula developed by Krieglstein's son for this process reads as such:

It is important to note that is not necessarily just the sum total of two perspectives, but rather a new and unique truth that is only achieved through sharing.

Current relevance 

Transcendental perspectivism's call for compassion of the other has gained it widespread acceptance in the partnership field founded by Riane Eisler.  The philosophy's unique perspective on the role consciousness plays in the development of physical truths has gained it some recognition in the field of consciousness research.  To help focus the practical acceptance of transcendental perspectivism, Krieglstein wrote a manifesto containing 11 key facets of the philosophy.

1. Transcendental perspectivism recognizes truth as experiential and personal, but not as objective and universal. Therefore, all religious beliefs including agnosticism and atheism are respected equally, as long as they do not impose their values on others.

2. Transcendental perspectivism prefers diversity and difference over singularity. These are assumed to be more natural and beneficial in evolutionary terms.

3. Transcendental perspectivism rejects domination in all its forms. It especially rejects domination of men over women. For this reason Transcendental Perspectivism embraces a reevaluation of the philosophical canon from a feminist perspective.

4. Transcendental perspectivism aims for cooperation and connectedness over competition and survival of the fittest. This, too, is seen to be more natural and adaptive.

5. Transcendental perspectivism assumes that there is a unique perspective, an inside-out view for everything that exists, including Nothingness. This puts consciousness at the center.

6. Central to transcendental perspectivism is the search for the Other. Since all is consciousness we can communicate with all. This makes transcendental perspectivism a shamanistic philosophy.

7. Transcendental perspectivism assumes a holistic view of the human body. Mind and body are one. Healing the body can never be seen in isolation and vice versa, a sickness of the mind affects the body.

8. As a shamanistic philosophy transcendental perspectivism provides the basis for a reanimation of the natural (material or inanimate) world. This will not result in a new superstition, but will be complemented by mathematical structure and empirical verification.

9. Transcendental perspectivism bridges the gap between the sciences and the humanities. It reunites the various fields of the cognitive enterprise of humanity by providing a new and in depth understanding of the physical world on which all human knowledge is based.

10. By providing a full and in-depth understanding of the physical nature of the human being transcendental perspectivism initiates a renaissance of the body. It invites a physical celebration of the human being within a physical world. This reevaluation of the human body will lead to a third enlightenment, the Enlightenment of the Body.

11. By reconnecting humanity with the rest of the physical world transcendental perspectivism will initiate a new spirituality. This has been called a cosmic spiritually. It is cosmic consciousness because these new individuals will be fully aware of being members of a larger whole, as they themselves are the composite symphony of numerous smaller wholes.

Relevant publications

External links 
 Transcendental Perspectivism
 Compassionate Thinking

Theory of mind
Metaphysical theories
Transcendentalism